Edgar Wrigley was a New Zealand rugby footballer who represented New Zealand in both rugby union and rugby league.

Early years
Wrigley was born in Masterton, New Zealand to Edmund & Betsy Hannah Wrigley and was a plumber by trade. He had five siblings, sisters Bertha, Charlotte & Alice and brothers Harry and Tom.

Rugby union career
Wrigley played rugby union for the Red Star club in Masterton and between 1903 and 1907 he played 18 games for Wairarapa. His brothers, Harry and Tom, also represented the Union.

When Wrigley made his All Blacks début in 1905 he was only 19 years 79 days of age and was the youngest person to play a test for the All Blacks. This record stood until 1994, when it was broken by Jonah Lomu.

Rugby league playing career
Wrigley was selected to be part of the professional All Blacks 1907-1908 tour of Australia and Great Britain. He played in eight tests for the Kiwis and was noted for his goal kicking abilities.

Following the tour Wrigley returned to Britain for a full-time professional career, signed with Runcorn for £400 and a guarantee of employment as a plumber. He later moved to Huddersfield, making 169 appearances for the club, before joining Hunslet for a fee of £550. He went to war and after returning played 7 games for Hunslet in the 1920-21 season before retiring.

County Cup Final appearances
Wrigley played , and scored a try, and a conversion in Huddersfield's 21–0 victory over Batley in the 1909 Yorkshire County Cup Final during the 1909–10 season at Headingley Rugby Stadium, Leeds on Saturday 27 November 1909, played right-, i.e. number 3, and scored a conversion in the 2–8 defeat by Wakefield Trinity in the 1910 Yorkshire Cup final during the 1910–11 season at Headingley Rugby Stadium, Leeds on Saturday 3 December 1910, and played , and scored a try in the 22–10 victory over Hull Kingston Rovers in the 1911 Yorkshire Cup final during the 1911–12 season at Belle Vue, Wakefield on Saturday 25 November 1911.

Rugby league coaching career
He later coached Hull FC, and Bradford Northern.

County Cup Final appearances
Wrigley was the coach in Hull's 2–8 defeat by Dewsbury in the 1927 Yorkshire County Cup Final during the 1927–28 season at Headingley Rugby Stadium, Leeds on Saturday 26 November 1927.

References

External links

1886 births
1958 deaths
Bradford Bulls coaches
Dual-code rugby internationals
Huddersfield Giants players
Hull F.C. coaches
Hunslet R.L.F.C. players
New Zealand builders
New Zealand expatriate sportspeople in England
New Zealand international rugby union players
New Zealand national rugby league team players
New Zealand plumbers
New Zealand rugby league coaches
New Zealand rugby league players
New Zealand rugby union players
Rugby league centres
Rugby league five-eighths
Rugby league players from Masterton
Rugby league wingers
Rugby union centres
Rugby union players from Masterton
Runcorn RFC players